Vasia Panagopoulou (born 6 October 1966, in Mytilene, Greece) is a Greek theatre and stage actress who starred in Erotas.

References

Greek soap opera actresses
Greek stage actresses
People from Mytilene
1966 births
Living people
21st-century Greek actresses